Alberto González, nicknamed Gonzalito (1922 — 21 August 2003) was a Paraguayan football defender who played for Paraguay in the 1950 FIFA World Cup. He also played for Club Olimpia.

References

External links
FIFA profile

1922 births
Paraguayan footballers
Paraguay international footballers
Association football defenders
Club Olimpia footballers
1950 FIFA World Cup players
2003 deaths